Szarów may refer to the following places in Poland:

 Szarów, Lesser Poland Voivodeship
 Szarów, Łódź Voivodeship